The Murphy Trail and Bridge in San Juan County, Utah, United States, were used to move livestock from winter range along the Green River to highland summer range from about 1917 to about 1964. The trail and bridge are located in what is now Canyonlands National Park and the trail is now used as a hiking path. The bridge was made from logs and rough-cut planking, and was built around 1917 by J. Idiart and D. Allies. The  bridge was reconstructed in 1998 and no longer retains historic integrity.

See also

 List of bridges on the National Register of Historic Places in Utah
 National Register of Historic Places listings in Grand County, Utah
 Dewey Bridge Member – a type of Entrada Sandstone named for the Dewey Bridge

References

External links

National Register of Historic Places in Canyonlands National Park
Transportation in San Juan County, Utah
Bridges on the National Register of Historic Places in Utah
Hiking trails in Utah
Bridges in Utah
Historic districts on the National Register of Historic Places in Utah
National Register of Historic Places in San Juan County, Utah